"72 Hours" is the seventeenth episode of the fifth season of the American sitcom The Golden Girls. The episode initially aired on February 17, 1990. It features Betty White as Rose finding out she may have been given an HIV-positive blood transfusion.

Plot 
While the girls are preparing for a wildlife fundraiser Rose receives a letter from the hospital informing her that she may have been given a transfusion of HIV-positive blood. She is told she needs to go to the hospital to be tested

When Rose arrives at the hospital for her test she gives the receptionist Dorothy's name after being encouraged to give a false name. While sitting in the waiting room Blanche tells Rose that she isn't alone in her testing experience because she has also been tested for HIV. after receiving her test Rose is told she needs to wait three days before finding out the results of her test. 

While Rose is waiting at home for her test results she is hysterical and Blanche offers to take her out to take her mind off of things. While Rose and Blanche are gone Dorothy finds out that Sophia has been using public bathrooms to avoid using the same facilities as Rose. Sophia has also been marking cups Rose has been using with an "R," after being questioned she remarks that she knows she can't catch it but she is scared so she isn't acting rationally. 

Later, Rose is sitting at the table with Blanche lamenting her bad luck. She says "This isn't supposed to happen to people like me." This is followed by the implication that it would make more sense for someone who isn't a good person to have this type of scare. Blanche asks Rose if she is implying that Blanche should be in her position, Rose says no. Blanche reminds Rose that, "AIDS is not a bad persons disease... It is not God punishing people for their sins." the women sans Rose are sitting around the table and decide to unequivocally support Rose, Sophia decides to drink out of an "R" cup. 

After her 72 hours are up Rose finds out that she has tested negative. The girls all celebrate and plan to attend the banquet later that night together.

Production 
"72 Hours" was written by Tracy Gamble and Richard Vaczy. Vaczy said of the episode "Tracy and I really loved the idea of showing what must that time be like between knowing something might be wrong and finding out what it is. And with the theater backgrounds of everyone on the show and the people they knew with HIV and AIDS, we thought everyone would appreciate and therefore love it. We guessed wrong. It turned out to be the darkest week I ever experienced on that stage, because the material hit so close to home." 
Gamble said " This episode was based on a true story that had happened to my mother. She got notified that if you had had a transfusion in this certain period of time, you had to get checked. She and my dad were scared to death. It ended up fine, and she knew that the odds were against there being anything wrong. But it was hell to sweat out those seventy-two hours until she got the results."

Peter D. Beyt, the editor of the show, revealed during the editing process of the show that his partner was dying of HIV/AIDS.

Reception 
Variety ranked "72 Hours" within the top ten list of their best "Golden Girls" episodes ever.

In the article "What Golden Girls Taught us About AIDS" Barbra Fletcher writes about how the episode brought AIDS into viewers' homes in a way that made the uncomfortable things not so uncomfortable.

Sascha Cohen writes about how the writers of the show direct shame at the behaviors of paranoia surrounding AIDS instead of toward the person being tested for the disease.

Jared Clayton Brown writes about how in tackling the topic of AIDS the shows writers took a step in introducing the topic to a viewership that considered themselves at very low risk for contracting it and established that they were also vulnerable. 

Clare Sewell writes about how while the show eventually tied itself up in a mostly neat bow it still managed to bring light upon a controversial topic with little judgment.

References

Further reading
 Browne. (2020). The Golden Girls. Wayne State University Press.
 
 
 “‘The Golden Girls’ 72 Hours.” IMDb, IMDb.com, 17 Feb. 1990, http://www.imdb.com/title/tt0589704/
 “About HIV/AIDS.” Centers for Disease Control and Prevention, Centers for Disease Control and Prevention, 30 June 2022
 Colucci, Jim. Golden Girls Forever: An Unauthorized Look behind the Lanai. Harper Design, an Imprint of HarperCollins Publishers, 2016.
 Fletcher, Barbara. “What 'the Golden Girls' Taught Us about Aids.” NPR, NPR, 22 July 2014, https://www.npr.org/2014/07/22/333759394/what-the-golden-girls-taught-us-about-aids.
 Bell, BreAnna. “'The Golden Girls': 25 Best Episodes Ranked.” Variety, Variety, 26 Aug. 2020, https://variety.com/lists/golden-girls-best-episodes-ranked/sick-and-tired-part-1-and-2/.
 The Golden Girls (A Titles & Air Dates Guide), https://www.epguides.com/GoldenGirls/
 “72 Hours,” The Golden Girls, NBC, February 17 1990.
 Sewell, Claire. “Deconstructing HIV and AIDS on the Golden Girls.” Nursing Clio, 4 Dec. 2018, https://nursingclio.org/2018/12/04/deconstructing-hiv-and-aids-on-the-golden-girls/

HIV/AIDS in television
The Golden Girls
1990 television episodes